Guido Winkmann (born 27 November 1973) is a German football referee who is based in Kerken. He referees for SV Nütterden of the Lower Rhine Football Association.

Refereeing career
Winkmann started his refereeing career in 2001, and in 2004 he was promoted to the 2. Bundeliga. In 2011, he was promoted to the elite group of referees who referee the Bundesliga. His first Bundesliga match was on 16 August 2008 when he refereed Energie Cottbus and TSG 1899 Hoffenheim

Personal life
Guido lives in Kerken and is a police officer.

References

External links
 Guido Winkmann at dfb.de 
 Guido Winkmann at WorldFootball.net

1973 births
Living people
German football referees
Sportspeople from Düsseldorf (region)